Alexander Dennis is a British bus manufacturing company based in Larbert, Scotland. The largest bus and coach manufacturer in the United Kingdom with a 50% market share in 2019, it has manufacturing plants and partnerships in Canada, China, Europe, Hong Kong, Malaysia, New Zealand, Singapore, South Africa and the United States.

History

TransBus - the precursor of Alexander Dennis

Mayflower Corporation acquired Scottish bus-makers, Walter Alexander, in August 1995 and English bus-makers, Dennis Group, in October 1998. In 2000, Mayflower and Henlys Group merged their British bus-making operations into a 70:30 joint venture with Alexander, Dennis and Henlys' Plaxton merged to form TransBus International. The factories concerned employed 3,300 staff in seven places in England (Anston, Guildford, Scarborough and Wigan), Scotland (Falkirk) and Northern Ireland (Belfast).

Plaxton's Scarborough operations was planned to close on 3 May 2001 with the loss of 700 jobs blamed on the fall in tourism after the foot and mouth epidemic broke out. Minibus production was moved to the former Walter Alexander factory at Falkirk. However, the Scarborough factory did not close altogether, for 200 staff returned to work after the summer break.

Mayflower was valued at £700 million in 1999. By March 2004, that stock market valuation had fallen to £22 million. The following month Mayflower was placed in administration, amid accusations of four years of falsifying crucial company records as to customers' payments to HSBC, counting the same income twice. One outcome was that certain members of the Dennis pension fund would receive only 40 per cent of their pensions, though others would continue to receive their full entitlement. TransBus was also placed in administration.

TransBus Plaxton was sold to in a management buyout to Brian Davidson and Mike Keane with the support of a private equity group.

Formation of Alexander Dennis

A group of Scottish investors, Noble Grossart, David Murray, Brian Souter and Ann Gloag, purchased the business from administrator Deloitte in May 2004.

The former Alexander Belfast plant was not included in the deal and closed. Alexander Dennis ultimately inherited a number of plants from TransBus: the former Alexander factories in Falkirk, Scotland; the Dennis factory in Guildford and later the former Plaxton factories in Anston and Scarborough. The former Northern Counties factory in Wigan closed in January 2005.

Dennis Group had produced a range of both bus and coach chassis and bodies as well as fire engines. Included among its range of chassis were the Dennis Dart and Dennis Trident. They also produced export variants for service in Hong Kong, Singapore and other locations. Plaxton made coaches, as well as the President double decker body (built on Trident, DAF DB250 and Volvo B7TL chassis) and the single decker Pointer body, built on the Dart chassis.

In May 2007, Alexander Dennis purchased Plaxton, thus reuniting the two former TransBus businesses.

In October 2008, Alexander Dennis signed a deal with ElDorado National to assemble the Enviro500 for the United States market. In 2011, Alexander Dennis entered an agreement with Kiwi Bus Builders to assemble its products for the New Zealand market.

In May 2012, NFI Group and Alexander Dennis announced a new joint-venture to design and manufacture medium-duty low-floor bus (or midi bus) for the North American market. New Flyer would handle production and marketing, and Alexander Dennis would handle the engineering and testing. The joint venture was dissolved in 2017. In June 2012, Alexander Dennis acquired Australian bodybuilder Custom Coaches. However, in May 2014, Custom Coaches was placed into administration and later sold to a consortium headed by its former owner.

In 2015 Alexander Dennis established an assembly plant in Vaughan, Ontario for orders to Metrolinx. In October 2015, Alexander Dennis signed a deal with BYD to body electric buses. From 2021, Alexander Dennis will build its own electric chassis.

NFI Group era

In May 2019, Alexander Dennis was sold to NFI Group, in a deal worth £320 million. Souter Investments retain an interest, taking shares in NFI Group as part of the transaction. The two companies had been engaged in a joint venture from 2012 until 2017.

In August 2020, Alexander Dennis announced plans to cut 650 jobs from its UK manufacturing sites including Falkirk, Scarborough and Guildford, citing a demand drop due to the COVID-19 pandemic. Bus chassis production moved from Guildford to Falkirk.

June 2021 saw Alexander Dennis open a base in Ballymena, Northern Ireland, which was described by local media as "boosting economic growth".

In July 2021, Alexander Dennis announced plans for construction of a new staff office complex and museum in Farnborough, Hampshire named Trident House. The centre was expected to be completed in early 2022. Alexander Dennis also entered a business partnership with Australian electric bus supplier Nexport to assemble electric city buses locally, with Australian manufacturing expected to begin in early 2022.

In April 2022, Alexander Dennis commenced trials of an autonomous Alexander Dennis Enviro200 MMC  working with Stagecoach Group, as part of a two-week pilot. Two months later in June, the company formally opened its Trident House complex, while at the same time, launched a refresh of its brand identity.

Products

Buses

Current 
Complete buses
 Enviro200MMC (2015–present)
 Enviro400MMC (2014–present)
 Enviro500MMC (2012–present)
Bus Bodies
 Enviro400 City (2015–present)

Future
 Enviro 100EV
 Enviro 400EV
 Enviro 500EV

Discontinued 
Bus bodies
 Pointer (2001–2007, originally made by Plaxton, replaced by Enviro200 Dart)
 ALX300 (2001-2007, originally Alexander, replaced by Enviro300)
 ALX400 (2001-2006, originally Alexander, replaced by Enviro400)
 President (2001-2005, originally Plaxton, replaced by Enviro400)
Complete buses (or chassis/body only)
 Enviro200/200H (TransBus, 2003–2007)
 Enviro200 Dart (2006–2017, Enviro200H hybrid 2008–2011)
 Enviro300 (2001–2015)
 Enviro350H (2010-2013)
 Enviro400 (2005–2018)
 Enviro500 (2002–2014)
Bus chassis
 Dart SLF
 Trident 2
Coach chassis
 Javelin
 R-Series

Fire engine (Chassis and crew cab) 

Fire engine vehicles were built by Dennis Group and sold under the Dennis Fire brand until 2007. The bodywork on a majority of the later chassis were built by a neighbouring company, John Dennis Coachbuilders Limited.

Discontinued 
 Sabre
 Rapier
 Dagger
 RS/SS
 DS
 DFS

See also 

 List of buses

References

External links 

 
 BUSRide article on TransBus International, with details of its collapse

 
Motor vehicle manufacturers of Scotland
Hybrid electric bus manufacturers
Emergency services equipment makers
Vehicle manufacturing companies established in 2004
British companies established in 2004
2004 establishments in Scotland
Companies based in Falkirk (council area)
2019 mergers and acquisitions
British subsidiaries of foreign companies